"Go Tight!" is the second single from AKINO, produced and composed by Yoko Kanno. The title track is used as the second opening theme of the anime Genesis of Aquarion and an insert song of the sequel Aquarion Evol. "Go Tight!" peaked at #18 on the Oricon Weekly Charts and charted for seven weeks. Gabriela Robin is credited as the lyricist for "Omna Magni" and "Esperança!". A version of the title track as sung by some of the cast members of the series is featured as a B-side on the digital re-release of "Genesis of Aquarion".

Track list
"Go Tight!" – 4:44
 – 1:38
Yui Makino
 – 2:32

"Go Tight! (Instrumental)" – 4:41

References

External links
Genesis of Aquarion discography

2005 singles
Anime songs
Genesis of Aquarion
Songs written by Yoko Kanno
Victor Entertainment singles
2005 songs